{{Automatic taxobox
|image = Tristichotrochus haliarchus 01.JPG
|image_caption =  Tristichotrochus haliarchus 
|taxon = Tristichotrochus
|authority = Ikebe, 1942
|type_species= Calliostoma aculeatum G. B. Sowerby III, 1912 
|synonyms_ref = 
|synonyms = Calliostoma (Tristichotrochus) Ikebe, 1942
|display_parents = 4
}}Tristichotrochus is a genus of sea snails, marine gastropod mollusks, in the family Calliostomatidae within the superfamily Trochoidea, the top snails, turban snails and their allies.

Species
Species within the genus Tristichotrochus include:
 Tristichotrochus aculeatus (G. B. Sowerby III, 1912)
 Tristichotrochus consors (Lischke, 1872)
 Tristichotrochus gendalli (B. A. Marshall, 1979)
 Tristichotrochus haliarchus (Melvill, 1889)
 Tristichotrochus multiliratus (G. B. Sowerby III, 1875)
 Tristichotrochus shingawaensis (Tokunaga, 1906)
 Tristichotrochus tosaensis Kuroda & Habe, 1961
 Tristichotrochus unicus (Dunker, 1860)The following species were brought into synonymy:' Tristichotrochus amamiensis Sakurai, 1994: synonym of Calliostoma amamiense (Sakurai, 1994) (original combination)
 Tristichotrochus canaliculatus Sasao & Habe, 1973: synonym of Calliostoma canaliculatum (Sasao & Habe, 1973)(original combination)
 Tristichotrochus crossleyae (E. A. Smith, 1910): synonym of Calliostoma crossleyae E. A. Smith, 1910 (superseded combination)
 Tristichotrochus galea Sakurai, 1994: synonym of Calliostoma galea (Sakurai, 1994)
 Tristichotrochus hayamanus Kuroda & Habe, 1971: synonym of Calliostoma hayamanum (Kuroda & Habe, 1971) (original combination)
 Tristichotrochus ikukoae (Sakurai, 1994): synonym of Calliostoma hayamanum (Kuroda & Habe, 1971) (original combination)
 Tristichotrochus iris Kuroda & Habe in Habe, 1961: synonym of Calliostoma iris (Kuroda & Habe, 1961) (original combination)
 Tristichotrochus iwaotakii Azuma, 1961: synonym of Calliostoma iwaotakii (Azuma, 1961)
 Tristichotrochus katoi Sakurai, 1994: synonym of Calliostoma katoi (Sakurai, 1994) (original combination)
 Tristichotrochus koma Shikama & Habe, 1965: synonym of Calliostoma koma (Shikama & Habe, 1965) (superseded combination)
 Tristichotrochus levibasis Kuroda & Habe, 1971: synonym of Calliostoma levibasis (Kuroda & Habe, 1971) (superseded combination)
 Tristichotrochus margaritissimus Habe & Okutani, 1968: synonym of Calliostoma margaritissimum (Habe & Okutani, 1968) (superseded combination)
 Tristichotrochus mikikoae Kosuge & Oh-Ishi, 1970: synonym of Calliostoma mikikoae (Kosuge & Oh-Ishi, 1970)
 Tristichotrochus nakamigawai Sakurai, 1994: synonym of Calliostoma nakamigawai (Sakurai, 1994)
 Tristichotrochus problematicus Kuroda & Habe, 1971: synonym of Calliostoma problematicum (Kuroda & Habe, 1971) (superseded combination)
 Tristichotrochus sakashitai Sakurai, 1994: synonym of Calliostoma sakashitai (Sakurai, 1994) (original combination)
 Tristichotrochus sugitanii Sakurai, 1994: synonym of Calliostoma sugitanii (Sakurai, 1994) (original combination)
 Tristichotrochus takaseanus Okutani, 1972: synonym of Calliostoma takaseanum (Okutani, 1972) (original combination)
 Tristichotrochus tsuchiyai Kuroda & Habe, 1971: synonym of Calliostoma tsuchiyai (Kuroda & Habe, 1971) (original combination)
 Tristichotrochus uranipponensis Okutani, 1969: synonym of Calliostoma uranipponense'' (Okutani, 1969) (original combination)

References

 Ikebe, N. (1942). Trochid Mollusca Calliostoma of Japan, fossil and recent. Japanese Journal of Geology and Geography. 18: 249-282.

Calliostomatidae